Heathen Hill is a mountain located in the Catskill Mountains of New York south-southeast of Franklin. Oak Hill is located north-northeast, Sherman Hill is located west, and Johnson Hill is located south of Heathen Hill.

References

Mountains of Delaware County, New York
Mountains of New York (state)